Ho-401 was a Japanese aircraft autocannon that saw limited, if any, use during World War II. It was a large-caliber version of the 37 mm Ho-203 cannon. The cannon was used on the ground attack aircraft, Kawasaki Ki-102.

Specifications
Caliber: 57 mm (2.25 in)
Ammunition: 57 x 121R (1,550 g)
Weight: 150 kg (330 lb)
Rate of fire: 80 rounds/min
Muzzle velocity: 495 m/s (1,624 ft/s)

References
 The Pacific War Encyclopedia

Aircraft guns
Autocannon
Machine guns of Japan
57 mm artillery